Campiglossa lyncea is a species of tephritid or fruit flies in the genus Campiglossa of the family Tephritidae.

Distribution
The species is found in India, Vietnam.

References

Tephritinae
Insects described in 1913
Taxa named by Mario Bezzi
Diptera of Asia